Gunther's robber frog, Günther's robber frog, or Guerreran robber frog (Craugastor omiltemanus, in Spanish rana-ladrona de Omilteme) is a species of frog in the family Craugastoridae. It is endemic to the Sierra Madre del Sur in the Guerrero state, Mexico.
Its natural habitats are pine, oak, and pine-oak forests with plenty of leaf-litter on the ground. It is a relatively common species but declining and threatened by habitat loss and disturbance.

Conservation 
In Mexico, the frog has been protected under the Mexican law. The Gunther's Robber Frog is need of conservation protection of their habitat and is being looked over at the Omiltemi Ecological State Park.

References

Craugastor
Endemic amphibians of Mexico
Amphibians described in 1900
Taxa named by Albert Günther
Taxonomy articles created by Polbot
Fauna of the Sierra Madre del Sur